Launstroff is a commune in the Moselle department in Grand Est in north-eastern France.

Launstroff is a small agricultural community consisting of 50-60 houses, with few exceptions over fifty years old.

Geography
Launstroff is located 1.5 km from the German border.

History
In the village square, next to the church, is a war memorial to those who gave their lives in the World War I and World War II. During World War II, there are records of US troops being in the village, which is located almost on the Siegfried Line.

Sights
Many large stone sculptures can be found in the area. Just outside the village, running along the international border, many smaller carved stones can be found marking the border as it has changed over the last 250 years.

Economy
The economy is based on agriculture. There are no shops, restaurants, or hotels in the village.

Transportation
The village has a bus service linking it to nearby communities. There is no link by public transport into Germany and no rail link. The village is surrounded by pathways and lies on several cycle routes.

See also
 Communes of the Moselle department

References

External links
 

Communes of Moselle (department)